Pirtek is a global brand specialising in industrial piping systems. It was founded in Australia in 1980 by Peter Duncan, expanding into the United Kingdom in 1988 and the United States in 1996. It operates its business using a franchise model.

History
Pirtek was founded in 1980 by Peter Duncan and Wally Davey. The name is a derivation of Pirelli Technology–Pirelli being one of their major suppliers. The company initially began as a grouping of distributors before branching out into franchising in 1985. 

The company expanded as a franchise to the United Kingdom in 1988 as Pirtek Europe. The European operation was originally a partnership between the original founders and British businessmen Forbes Petrie and Peter Brennan. Pirtek Europe was bought out by Vision Capital in 2007, then to Halifax Group in 2015.

In the late 1990s, the parent company, Pirtek Fluid Transfer Solutions sold off 80 percent of the United States franchise business, ultimately buying back the share in 2015.

Sports sponsorships

Pirtek became involved in sporting sponsorship during the late 1990s, sponsoring Stone Brothers Racing. The company has supported motor sports outfits in various countries, as well as becoming involved in rugby league.

Motor racing

Australia
Stone Brothers Racing naming rights sponsor from 1998 until 2005 with Jason Bright, Craig Baird and Marcos Ambrose
Britek Motorsport Australian Rally Championship naming rights sponsor in 2007 with Michael Guest and Darren Windus
Enduro Cup naming rights sponsor since 2013
DJR Team Penske naming rights sponsor at the 2016 WD-40 Phillip Island SuperSprint
Perth SuperNight event sponsor from 2019

United Kingdom
naming rights sponsor for Andrew Jordan's British Touring Car Championship campaigns with Eurotech Racing (2010-2014), Triple Eight Racing (2015), Motorbase Performance (2016) and West Surrey Racing (2017–2019)

United States
Team Murray that competed at the 2016 Indianapolis 500 with Matthew Brabham
Brad Keselowski Racing naming rights sponsor in 2017 NASCAR Camping World Truck Series with Austin Cindric and 2018 NASCAR Xfinity Series livery with Team Penske

Rugby league
Parramatta Eels naming rights sponsor from 2004 until 2013
 New Zealand Kiwis main sponsor since 2008

Sports grounds
naming rights sponsor at Parramatta Stadium from 2014 until 2016

References

External links

Companies based in Sydney
1980 establishments in Australia